ATP phosphohydrolase may refer to:

 ATP phosphohydrolase (steroid-exporting), a set index article, including:
 Steroid-transporting ATPase, an enzyme
 Xenobiotic-transporting ATPase, an enzyme
 Myosin ATPase, an enzyme
 Dynein ATPase, an enzyme
 Chaperonin ATPase, an enzyme
 Non-chaperonin molecular chaperone ATPase, an enzyme
 DNA helicase, an enzyme